In mathematics, the collage theorem characterises an iterated function system whose attractor is close, relative to the Hausdorff metric, to a given set. The IFS described is composed of contractions whose images, as a collage or union when mapping the given set, are arbitrarily close to the given set. It is typically used in fractal compression.

Statement 
Let  be a complete metric space. 
Choose an iterated function system (IFS)  with contractivity factor   where  (the contractivity factor  of the IFS is the maximum of the contractivity factors of the maps ).  Suppose

where  is the Hausdorff metric. Then

where A is the attractor of the IFS. Equivalently,

Informally, If  is close to being stabilized by the IFS, then  is also close to being the attractor of the IFS.

See also
 Michael Barnsley
 Barnsley fern

References

External links
 A description of the collage theorem and interactive Java applet at cut-the-knot.
 Notes on designing IFSs to approximate real images. 
   Expository Paper on Fractals and Collage theorem

Fractals
Theorems in geometry